The Jamhuri Stadium is a multi-purpose stadium in Dodoma, the capital city of Tanzania. It is currently used mostly for football matches and serves as the home venue for JKT Ruvu Stars. The venue holds 30,000 people.

References

World Stadiums 

Football venues in Tanzania
Buildings and structures in Dodoma
Multi-purpose stadiums in Tanzania